National Highway 731 (NH 731) is a  National Highway in India.

References

National Highways in Uttar Pradesh
Transport in Jaunpur, Uttar Pradesh
Transport in Sultanpur, Uttar Pradesh
Transport in Lucknow